Amelia Academy is an independent co-educational college preparatory school in Amelia, Virginia.  It was founded in 1964 as a segregation academy. The campus is located within the rural Piedmont region of central Virginia.

History
Amelia Academy was founded in 1964 during Virginia's policy of massive resistance to court-mandated integration of public schools.  At this time most of the white students in Amelia County transferred to the new Amelia Academy as a segregation academy.

Like many such schools, Amelia Academy had its tax-exempt status suspended by the Internal Revenue Service in the early 1970s due to its racially discriminatory admission policies. The school has since regained its tax-exempt status as it has continually integrated.

Amelia Academy regained its tax-exempt status in 1985. However, in February 1986 the Internal Revenue Service announced that it was opening an investigation to determine whether the Amelia Academy and two other Virginia private schools had, in fact, abandoned racial discrimination in admissions. In April 1986 the IRS announced that both the Amelia Academy and the Isle of Wight Academy would have their tax exemptions revoked.

As of 1988, no Black student had ever attended the school. In May of that year, headmistress Dallas De K. Lewis told the Richmond Times-Dispatch that "We have an open-door policy. We'd be delighted if we could get some other races." In 1993, the school's lack of integration was the subject of controversy when gubernatorial candidate George Allen attended a school fundraiser and was surprised to discover that it was all-white.

1993 gubernatorial election
Amelia Academy was briefly in the news during the 1993 Virginia gubernatorial campaign. Republican candidates George Allen and Michael Farris attended a picnic at the school.  Both men later denied knowing that the event was a fundraiser for the school, that the school had been founded as a segregation academy, and that the student body at the time was all white.  At the time, headmistress Lewis told The Washington Post that the Academy "has always had an open-door policy," and that anyone who met admissions standards was welcome to attend.  She also noted that the school had not yet regained its tax-exempt status from the IRS, and recalled that, although the Academy had had a Korean student during the IRS investigation, the investigator noted that "we may have met the letter of the law but because we had no blacks, we didn't meet the spirit of the law." Peter Eliades, unsuccessful Virginia Democratic candidate for the U.S. House of Representatives, also attended the event.  His campaign manager told the Times-Dispatch "I had absolutely no idea there was any connection...with a segregation academy. If there is a connection, we are appalled. We condemn any kind of discrimination."

Athletics
Amelia Academy is a member of the Virginia Commonwealth Conference (VCC). Their teams are known as "The Patriots."  Other member schools are Blessed Sacrament Huguenot, Brunswick Academy, Fuqua School, Isle of Wight Academy, Richmond Christian School, Southampton Academy, and Tidewater Academy. The boys’ basketball squad won the Virginia Independent Schools Athletic Association (VISAA) Championship, as well as the VCC regular season and conference tournament three times between 2011 and 2013. In 2013, the Amelia Academy Lady Patriots won the VISAA Championship, the VCC regular season and tournament championships; in 2012, they were VISAA State runner-up, as well as VCC regular season and tournament champions. The Lady Patriots were also VCC regular season and tournament champions in 2008.

References

Schools in Amelia County, Virginia
Private high schools in Virginia
Segregation academies in Virginia
Private middle schools in Virginia
Private elementary schools in Virginia
Educational institutions established in 1964
1964 establishments in Virginia